The East India Association (EIA) was a London-based organisation for matters concerning India. Its members were Indians and retired British officials.

About the Society
The East India Association was founded by Dadabhai Naoroji in 1866. The first President of the Association was Lord Lyveden. Meetings were held in Caxton Hall, Westminster. The EIA incorporated the National Indian Association in 1949, and became the Britain, India and Pakistan Association. In 1966 it amalgamated with the Royal India, Pakistan and Ceylon Society, and became the Royal Society for India, Pakistan and Ceylon.

Publications
 Journal of the East India Association - published from 1867 to 1917
 Asiatic Quarterly Review - first published in 1886, renamed the Imperial and Asiatic Quarterly Review and Oriental and Colonial Record, the title reverting to the Asiatic Quarterly Review in 1913, then shortened to Asiatic Review in 1914. Publication ceased in 1952.

See also
 Royal India Society
 National Indian Association
 Royal Society for India, Pakistan and Ceylon

References

Indian diaspora in the United Kingdom
Indian independence movement
Diaspora organisations based in London
1866 establishments in the United Kingdom
Organizations established in 1866